The cuneiform KÚR sign is used extensively in the Amarna letters. It also has a minor usage in the Epic of Gilgamesh. Its usage in the Amarna letters is due to the letters' topics of "hostilities", "war", or "warfare" in the discord amongst the city-states and the regional discord in the Canaan region. A large subset of the Amarna letters are written by vassal kings in governorship of cities, towns or regions in Canaan.

The sign is a simple two-stroke sign, a horizontal (or slight upward-stroke) with a stroke slashing downwards across its center. The end result cuneiform sign is easily compared to a "squashed-X" alphabetic.

KÚR is used and is defined as a capital-letter Sumerogram (majuscule), and specifically in the Akkadian language has the meaning of "warfare", "hostility", Akkadian nukurtu. Any syllabic cuneiform sign with 'n' or 't' can supply the beginning or end of "nukurtu".

Usage, and Amarna letters list
In the Epic of Gilgamesh, the KÚR sign is only used twice and only once for nukurtu, Tablet VI, line 40: "...a battering ram (Akkadian "iašubû") that attracts the enemy-('nukurtu', "hostility", nu-KÚR-ti) land,...."

List usage in Amarna letters
A partial of letters and the spelling of "nukurtu":

 nu-KÚR-te, Amarna letter EA 252, 252:9, (i-na nukurtu,, "in warfare"), photo here
 nu-KÚR-tu, EA 271, 271:11, obverse
 nu-KÚR-tu, EA 273, obverse
 nu-KÚR-ut, EA 286, 286:41, reverse

External links
Photo, Amarna letter EA 252, line 9, "in warfare", (i-na nu-KÚR-te)

References

Kovacs, Maureen Gallery, transl. with intro. (1985,1989) The Epic of Gilgamesh. Stanford University Press: Stanford, California. (Softcover ), Glossary, Appendices, Appendix (Chapter XII=Tablet XII) A line-by-line translation (Chapters I-XI).
Moran, William L. 1987, 1992. The Amarna Letters. Johns Hopkins University Press, 1987, 1992. 393 pages.(softcover)
 Parpola, 1971. The Standard Babylonian Epic of Gilgamesh, Parpola, Simo, Neo-Assyrian Text Corpus Project, c 1997, Tablet I thru Tablet XII, Index of Names, Sign List, and Glossary-(pp. 119–145), 165 pages.

Akkadian language - three letter syllables
Cuneiform signs
Sumerograms